The 1951 season was FC Steaua București's 4th season since its founding in 1947.

Divizia A

League table

Results 

Source:

Cupa României

Results

See also

 1951 Cupa României
 1951 Divizia A

Notes and references

External links
 1951 FC Steaua București matches

FC Steaua București seasons
1951–52 in Romanian football
1950–51 in Romanian football
Steaua, București
Steaua, București
Steaua
Steaua
Romanian football championship-winning seasons